Hermann Busse may refer to:
 Hermann Busse (politician), German politician
 Hermann Eris Busse, German novelist and literary critic